Sigurd Halling (20 July 1866 – 25 July 1938) was a Norwegian educator.

He was born in Lom to Honoratus Halling and Marie Henrikke Bomhoff, and was an uncle  of Else Halling.

He graduated as cand.theol. from the University in Christiania in 1892. He worked as teacher and headmaster at various schools in Kristiania. From 1907 he was in charge of both Otto Anderssen's private school and the Conradi Sisters' girl school. These were united and renamed to Halling's School. He was the principal teacher for prince Olav from 1913 to 1921. He was decorated as Knight, First Class of the Order of St. Olav in 1921.

References

1866 births
1938 deaths
People from Lom, Norway
University of Oslo alumni
Heads of schools in Norway